Ahmet Yorulmaz (1932 – 31 March 2014) was a Turkish journalist, novelist and translator. He was born in Ayvalık to a family of Cretan Turks deported to mainland Turkey as part of the Greek/Turkish population exchange decreed in the Treaty of Lausanne. His best-known novel Savaşın Çocukları (Children of War) deals with the lives of Muslims in Crete before the exchange. He was also translator of Greek literature into Turkish.

See also
 Cretan Turks
 Population exchange between Greece and Turkey

References

External links
Ahmet Yorulmaz's obituary 

Turkish novelists
1932 births
2014 deaths
People from Ayvalık
Turkish translators
20th-century novelists
20th-century translators